Spriit is an Estonian surname. Notable people with the surname include:

Edgar Spriit (1922–1993), Estonian journalist, satirist, editor and politician
Eero Spriit (born 1949), Estonian actor, theatre producer and director, and film and television producer

Estonian-language surnames